José Moises Mossiane (born 6 November 1970) is a Mozambican former swimmer. He competed in the men's 50 metre freestyle event at the 1992 Summer Olympics.

References

External links
 

1970 births
Living people
Mozambican male freestyle swimmers
Olympic swimmers of Mozambique
Swimmers at the 1992 Summer Olympics
Place of birth missing (living people)